John Aaron Baker (March 25, 1839November 19, 1919) was an American businessman and Republican politician.  He was a member of the Wisconsin State Assembly, representing southwest  during the 1871 session.

Biography
John A. Baker was born March 25, 1839, in Stephenson County, Illinois.  His father died when he was quite young, and he moved with his mother to Evansville, in Rock County, Wisconsin, where she remarried.  They soon moved further north to Stevens Point and Wausau.  Baker received a common school education and taught school at Wausau, where he was also elected town superintendent of schools.

In 1860, he enrolled in Lawrence University, in Appleton, Wisconsin, but his education was interrupted by the outbreak of the American Civil War.

Baker quickly volunteered for service in the Union Army and was enrolled in Company B of the 1st Wisconsin Cavalry Regiment.  The 1st Wisconsin Cavalry served in many of the important campaigns of the western theater of the war, including Chickamauga, Chattanooga, and Atlanta.

Baker served most of the war with his company, promoted to corporal and then quartermaster sergeant.  In early 1864, he was promoted to sergeant major, and then shortly thereafter commissioned as first lieutenant for Company I, where he served through most of the rest of the war.  He was in command of his company for much of his time as first lieutenant, and was offered a promotion to captain in January 1865, but declined.  He mustered out in March 1865, at the expiration of his term of enlistment.

Following his war service, Baker returned to Portage County, Wisconsin, and was elected town clerk of Stockton.  He subsequently attended the Albany Law School and moved east to Waupun, in Fond du Lac County in 1868.

In 1870, Baker was elected to the Wisconsin State Assembly running on the Republican Party ticket.  He represented Fond du Lac County's 2nd Assembly district in the 1871 session, which then comprised a portion of the southwest corner of the county.

In 1871, Baker became invested in the Dodge County Mutual Insurance Company and was elected secretary of the company for three years.  In 1874, he was one of the founding members of the all-volunteer Waupun Fire Company, and was elected foreman of the company.

Baker left Wisconsin in 1875 and moved to Nebraska.  He worked for a number of years as a dealer of water pumps and mills, before moving further west to Washington in 1892.  In Washington, Baker worked as a real estate dealer.

Baker died at his home in Everett, Washington, on November 19, 1919.

Personal life and family
John A. Baker was the eldest son of Aaron Baker and his wife Anna (née Allen).  He had a younger brother, William, who also served with him in the 1st Wisconsin Cavalry Regiment and lived his later years in Everett, Washington.

John A. Baker married Harmony Addie Bly in 1871.  They had two children together, though their second son, Arthur, died in childhood.

References

1839 births
1919 deaths
People from Stephenson County, Illinois
People from Evansville, Wisconsin
People from Wausau, Wisconsin
People from Portage County, Wisconsin
People from Waupun, Wisconsin
People from Fillmore County, Nebraska
People from Knox County, Nebraska
People from Everett, Washington
Albany Law School alumni
Republican Party members of the Wisconsin State Assembly
19th-century American politicians
People of Wisconsin in the American Civil War
Union Army officers